Funny Face is a 1957 musical film.

Funny Face or Funny Faces may also refer to:

Media productions
 Funny Face (musical), a 1927 musical by George and Ira Gershwin
 Funny Face (2020 film), a 2020 American drama film starring Cosmo Jarvis
 Funny Face (TV series), a 1971 U.S. TV sitcom starring Sandy Duncan
 "Funny Faces", an episode of Zoboomafoo

Music
 "Funny Face" (1927 song), title song of the musical Funny Face
Funny Face (soundtrack), soundtrack to the 1957 film
"Funny Face" (Donna Fargo song), 1972
"Funny Face", a song by U2 from The Million Dollar Hotel soundtrack
"Funny Face", a 1981 song by Sparks from Whomp That Sucker
"Funny Face", a song by the Red Hot Chili Peppers from "Snow (Hey Oh)"
"Funny Face", a song by Dave Davies from  "Susannah's Still Alive"

Other
Steeplechase Face, amusement park mascot
Funny Face (drink mix)
Funny Face (comedian), stage name of Benson Nana Yaw Oduro Boateng

See also
Gurn or making a face
High School! Kimengumi (English: High School! Funny-face Club)
"Hengao" (変顔) (English: Funny Face), episode of Karakai Jozu no Takagi-san
The Funny Face of the Godfather, 1973 film